Nelson Andrade (18 April 1933 – 16 March 1981) was a Brazilian boxer. He competed in the men's middleweight event at the 1952 Summer Olympics.

References

1933 births
1981 deaths
Brazilian male boxers
Olympic boxers of Brazil
Boxers at the 1952 Summer Olympics
Middleweight boxers
People from Botucatu